is a Japanese light novel series written by Jō Taketsuki and illustrated by Sikorski. It has been published by Shueisha since May 2008, first under their Super Dash Bunko imprint (which was abolished in 2014) and then under their Dash X Bunko imprint since. The series concluded with the 21st volume on November 22, 2017. It has been adapted into a manga series published in Shueisha's Super Dash & Go!. A 13-episode anime television series, produced by Diomedéa aired in Japan on AT-X and Tokyo MX beginning in July 2012 and ended in September 2012. Sentai Filmworks released an English dub of the TV series in North America. The novel's story focuses on Godou Kusanagi, a former middle school baseball player who was forced to retire due to injury, as he becomes a Campione after killing the god of war, Verethragna. Hanabee Entertainment later licensed the series on February 23, 2014. There is a sequel Campione! Lord of Realms (カンピオーネ！　ロード・オブ・レルムズ) and a spin-off based on it - Shiniki no Campiones (神域のカンピオーネス)

Plot
Godou Kusanagi, a former middle school baseball player who had to retire due to injury, is asked by his grandfather to return a stone tablet to a friend in Sardinia named Lucrezia Zora. After meeting the demonically manipulative sword-mistress Erica Blandelli, he encounters the god of war, Verethragna. After killing the god, Godou becomes a Campione, or god slayer. His duty is to fight heretical gods who start changing things to suit themselves, usually at the expense of the people in the area. One of the problems associated with being a Campione, is that his status keeps attracting attention and difficult girls. Erica, who strongly professes her love for him, usually creates awkward and misunderstood situations for him in particular. Every time he fights a god, he kisses one of the girls he has brought with him.

Characters

Main characters

Godou is the main protagonist of the series and is the 7th Campione. He is a retired middle school baseball player (wild pitch injured and weakened right shoulder), after his grandfather asked him to return a stone tablet in Sardinia to Lucrezia Zora. Upon his encounter with Erica Blandelli, he manages to slay the god Verethragna, a Persian god of Victory. After obtaining Verethragna's Golden Sword and becoming a Campione, Godou obtains the abilities of Verethragna's ten incarnations: Gale (wind), Bull (strength), White Stallion (sun), Camel (leg strength), Boar (trample), Youth (divine protection), Raptor (speed), Ram (resurrection), Goat (thunder), and Warrior (Golden Sword). The Golden Sword allows Godou to seal the authority of a god, only if he accomplish the condition of using the power which is to have substantial knowledge about his enemy. He receives the information via kissing one of the female protagonists, which is the only way to infuse the information into a Campione due to their incredible magic resistance. This and ingestion are the only ways someone can have their magic, benign or malign, bypass a majority of the resistance. He is a little afraid of women due to being completely dense to their feelings, numerous interrogations and punishments from his sister, along with Erica's pranks and occasional blackmail. He tends to take what people say at face value, missing their intentions.

Their battle tactics and colors (red and black) has likened them to that of red devils. Holding the rank of Great Knight and the title of Diavolo Rosso (Red Devil), she is a magic swordsman that through coincidence meets Godou and assists him while he was in Sardinia, Italy. She ends up falling in love with him. She uses her weapon Cuore di Leone (Heart of Lion), an enchanted sword that she can summon to her hand. She also has the ability to use the sword to summon a large silver lion which can attack in place of Erica in the anime. Her weapon can transform into a spear, lance or sword for offense, or simply a shield for defense. Its true form is that of a long, silvery, broadsword infused with the spell words of David which she must cast, giving it the ability to harm gods. She is able to multiply the Cuore di Leone, even after throwing it, or in its lion form. Whether there is a restriction on how many duplicates she can make, due to ability or power, is unknown but so far has made up to thirteen lions and seven spears. Her lions are infused with intelligence allowing them to act independently just like real lions, but under her control. Although she fares well against Liliana Kranjčar in martial arts as a knight, her magic expertise excels Liliana's and can be even be considered unrivaled in the areas of iron alchemy, fire, creation, transformation, destruction and reinforcement spells. Erica can use leap magic, able to boost jumping while in midair. She is an Italian girl who likes to keep herself in control of her own situation, thus she can be very forceful in her affection and jealousy. However, she knows her own limitations to be able to help and protect Godou, and she is willing to be open-minded enough to allow the other girls to become additional "wives", although she is to be recognized as his number one wife.

Yuri is a dark-haired Hime-Miko (princess shrine maiden) under Musashino, an organization whose duty is to protect Kanto, handling the greatest tasks and responsibilities. She is subject to the authority of The Committee for the Compilation of True History, a Japanese government based magic organization, who aims to use Godou to protect Japan while minimizing his potential as a threat. She is initially quite harsh on Godou due to the misunderstanding that Godou is doing something lecherous, but mostly she is kind with him, and is endured by Godou as he sees the self-sacrifice that lies behind it. Often called a Yamato nadeshiko, Yuri is clairvoyant and uses magic to heal and send knowledge to Godou. In terms of fighting level and physical stamina, she is the weakest, shown when playing sports, but excels at support and is unrivaled at information gathering. She is an excellent cook in both taste and visual appeal, and the head of the Tea Ceremony Club that Godōu's little sister Shizuka Kusanagi is a member of. Like Erica, she falls in love with Godou when she sees how willing he is to put his all to protect others. Yuri gets upset when she sees Godou with one of the other girls, (which she misinterprets as flirting), or extremely serious she unknowingly smiles while giving off an extremely cold presence like a yaksha.

Liliana is the Croatian childhood friend of Erica and belongs to the organization  which is a mage/knight organization similar to, yet occasionally working but usually competing with, the Copper Black Cross. The organization serves the Campione Salvatore Doni, although her grandfather and some other members favor and support the Campione Sasha Dejanstahl Voban by preference. The Bronze Black Cross are referred to as blue berserkers. Liliana has been also been called the Sword Fairy and Blue Witch, although these seem to be more nicknames as she is rarely called either while Erica is called or calls herself Diavolo Rosso often. She possesses the sword Il Maestro, able to fight with great speed, excellent magic, and flying attacks similar to that of a falcon. When released, takes on its true appearance of a naginata, which releases spell melodies when swung that can disrupt the concentration of even the toughest of opponents, although since magic in nature it has limit, if any effect, on Campiones or gods. However, in naginata form the spell words of David are infused into it as well giving it the ability to harm gods. She is often compared to be on equal footing to Erica in both martial skills and combat, as well as known by people to be among the top of the current generation of Great Knights. However, due to her direct and upfront nature, she does not have the political acumen Erica possesses and is more gullible to Erica and Karen's pranks. She is also in love with Godou, but does her best to hide it from others. Usually covering up her desire to be in close proximity or help Godou with claims of merely serving her role as a knight or bodyguard. She is a silver-haired girl with a svelte body. Though she lacks the well-curved, voluptuous figure Erica possesses, her beauty is more along that of an ephemeral, delicate fairy. She is great at housework and cooking, is a descendant of witches, and has the hobby of writing embarrassing romantic novels. Her expertise over Erica is in flight magic, witchcraft, potions, communicating with plants and animals, and spells relating to water, earth, and sky. This allows her to make flying attacks similar to a sparrow, but with the ability to halt in midair, unaffected by gravity, before continuing her attack. This also gives her the ability to swim through water as easily as a fish, harvest herbs, cast hard spells and create difficult potions. She proved invaluable in not only opening a gate to the astral realm to rescue Godou and Erica, but the knowledge to create the potion required to be unaffected by the astral realm's environment. She can also summon and use the Bow of Jonathon, which is powerful enough to harm gods, such as Perseus. Although it appears she shoots four arrows at a time, only one is real, the others are illusions to increase the chances of the real arrow hitting.

Ena is a girl with long, shiny, black hair with red eyes. She is a Hime Miko as well as a Yamato nadeshiko but with a figure similar to Erica's. She is the strongest of all Japan's Hime Miko, being specially trained by Susanoo. She is aggressive, impulsive, and has a tendency to ignore complicated things. Due to the harsh training she endured, Ena lacks a bit of common sense in everyday life, but this has made her an unpredictable fighter as she relies on instinct. She possesses the sword Ama no Murakumo no Tsurugi and can draw power from it, becoming possessed in the process. However, she can only do this for short periods before her body starts taking damage. Also, if she takes in too much power, there's a chance of Susanoo's instincts or Ama no Murakumo taking control of her and running amok. When this happens she can fight on par with Campiones and gods alike. Erica considers her a threat to her position with Godou, due to Ena being another harem member with both a strong personality and a voluptuous, curvy figure; Liliana and Yuri are more submissive and easier for Erica to either manipulate or dominate. Erica believes that Ena can get close to Godou as a "guy" with her forthright nature before showing some feminine charm as a "girl". Due to isolation from society during her training, Ena is not very experienced with relationships in general. Although her mission was to seduce Godou, she knew that he was her soulmate the instant she saw him and has completely fallen for him to the point that she is willing to be his mistress as long as she can be with him. She misunderstands his wanting to develop their relationship slowly as well as his desire to become a man good enough for her as signs that she is not good enough to be his wife, which frustrates Godou as much as Erica's wild antics do.

Campiones
Campione, or God Slayers, are humans who have obtain the abilities of the first slain god called Authorities. They have enhanced bodies that can heal from even mortal wounds much faster and magic abilities which exceed that of the most powerful mages. They also have very high magic immunity which protects them from mortal enemy magic, but also prevents them from receiving beneficial magic such as teaching or healing. Thus, a caster has to deliver the spells internally through methods such as kissing or ingestion. The number of the Campiones are in chronological from when they first appeared, not a reference to power level or actual age.

Voban is the 1st Campione and of Hungarian descent. He is a cold man whose only desire is to battle worthy opponents and obtaining abilities. His normal appearance is that of a healthy and athletic old man with gray hair. His true form is the appearance of a huge werewolf. Voban is the oldest of the Campiones, as he has defeated and usurped the authorities of Apollo and Osiris. He has the abilities to create severe storms, summon swarms of dire wolves, swallow sun-based attacks, turning people into salt with his eyes and summon the bodies of those he has killed to serve him.

Luo Hao is the 2nd Campione and of Chinese descent. She was a great figure who carried herself with royal splendor. She possess the full set of the five Confucian virtues: benevolence, righteousness, propriety, knowledge and integrity. She was seeking a worthy opponent who could defeat her just like Verethragna had before Godou met her. Also, she believes her valor to be the greatest in the world, she places greater value on herself than anyone else on the Earth and is undecided on whether humanity is worth saving or not. Despite all this, Luo Hao is very observant of formality and propriety, as well as the rules of etiquette. She is able to control flowers, albeit harmless, poisonous or dangerous. With over two hundred years experience she has mastered Daoist arts which allows her to use techniques similar to European magic spells. Another ability is changing herself to a small lizard, although whether it is an Authority or a Daoist art is unknown.

Aisha is the 3rd Campione and of Alexandrian descent. She has the nicknames the Eternal Beauty, Goddess of Caves or Mysterious Queen of Caves, which refers to her ability to create a hole to another world and has the appearance of a cave. She is a beautiful maiden with black hair and olive skin, having the personality of a wanderer. The Authorities she possess do not have any combat potential, however one of the Authorities she received from Persephone allows her to share the energy of life with living things which heals even severe wounds. Although, if she has a day to prep she can flip the Authority's "spring side" into the "winter side", which can remove life, but Godou stopped her from actually using it the time she considered it. Another she usurped from a certain Catholic saint in the Catholic religion causes everyone to like her which helps keep her out of trouble in areas where the locals ostracize or treat strangers with hostility. Although if she does not keep the effect toned down or inspires a group of defenders too often then she could unintentionally create a cult that would lay down their lives for her. This is considered a most troublesome Authority by Saint Raffaello in that most of the holes link to the past. This is a problem in that any changes in the past could affect the future similar to the butterfly effect. The main problem with this Authority is that she has no control over what time period the holes open up to, and the holes appearing and sucking her in whenever she forgets about having the Authority. Also, the connection in time is not stable so someone entering the hole a few minutes earlier or later than another person will still arrive at the same spot, but days or years before or after the other.

Annie is the 4th Campion and of American descent. She also goes by the masked identity of John Pluto Smith. A serious minded individual, she only lets her feelings show when she is drunk. When in the armored form of John Pluto Smith, she acts much more relaxed and flamboyant. At some point the Smith persona turned into a semi-split personality, which seems to express all the emotions and stuff Annie has been heavily suppressing. So Annie and Smith are aware and know everything the other personality experiences, but thoughts and actions reflect whichever one is out. She starts to grow feelings toward Godou after fighting alongside him and Luo Hao, although she denies to herself due to the difference between their ages and Godou's reputation of being a playboy. Has usurped the Authorities of Tezcatlipoca, which requires sacrificing sources to temporarily transform into a jaguar, and Artemis, which automatically reloads arrows in a large, six-shooter revolver. Annie wears dark leather suits, rectangular half-glasses, with short fiery red hair. John Pluto Smith wears various cloths that present the proper atmosphere of a hero over armor that makes her look like an insect, primarily the helmet, and hides the fact that Smith is a woman.
 

Alexander is the 5th Campione and of British descent. He is also known as Black Prince Alec, leader of political organization Royal Arsenal that oppose Princess Alice's organization Witengamot. He looks like a young man with black hair. He has an arrogant personality, willing to work with Alice when their goals align on issues. He has the Authority of Fallen Angel Ramiel "Black Lightning," an ability that grants him super speed. He can also turn himself into a lightning avatar made of plasma to travel even faster, evade physical injury and use lightning strikes. However, if the lightning avatar is dispelled, he will revert to his normal physical form. He also defeated the Minotaur Granting, which creates an underground labyrinth where he always understands the full layout and where his opponents are located, and the three Judging Furies, which returns all damage done in front of him back to an opponent using any physical or magical form of destructive power.

Salvatore is the 6th Campione and of Italian descent. He has blonde hair and has a scar going around his right shoulder where it meets the arm He has a carefree personality, considered by most to be a complete idiot with no common sense and lacks magical skills. He is on equal levels with Godou Kusanagi as a Campione, as they had a draw on their fight. Salvatore is also notably hated or strongly disliked by the Campione Sasha Dejanstahl Voban, for stealing his prey that he had summoned specifically to relieve boredom. He is feared for all the trouble his antics causes and his utter lack of understanding and caring about serious issues, as he believes his scabbard is the solution to every issue. He does not see Godou as a friend or an ally, but an adversary. He therefore anticipated for a rematch, warning Godou about Voban entering Japan as an excuse for Godou to grow stronger and faster. He is a former Templar candidate, but failed due to abysmally poor magic scores and ability well below that of a young novice who never heard of magic before. He is considered an exceptional prodigy with swords and always carries one around with him wherever he goes just in case he gets into an interesting fight. The Copper Black Cross answers to him since his home base coincides with their headquarters. He has usurped three Authorities from the king of the Tuatha Dé Danann. Nuadha (Ripping Arm of Silver) allows him to turn his arm silver and gaining the ability to cut through anything. Nordic hero Siegfried (Man of Steel) provides a body of steel that cannot be damaged but increases his mass in proportion to how strong the protection is. Vulcan (Return to Medieval Style) reduces the technology level of an area to that of the Middle Ages for about half a day. His fourth Authority he usurped from Dionysus, which causes all magical powers to overload, activate and run out of control. His creed and spell words is that he will not allow anything to exist in the world that he can not cut.

Uldin is the 8th Campione and of Hunnic descent. He is a warrior, who is compared to Godou, due to similarities in personalities and fighting temperaments, possibly due to being an unrecorded and distant ancestor. He has a habit of acting on his impulses and therefore has a harem of women spread throughout the world, although he is apparently married to four of them, with Ruska (first wife) and Clotilde (fourth wife) making their appearance along with Uldin. His other two wives are at two other fortresses he controls. As with the time period feels that if he likes a woman it is okay to carry her off as she will eventually fall for him like the others anyway. His primary Authority that is used is Dragon Tamer, which allows him to control the dragons that he keeps in the forest near his castle. He also can turn dragon bones into an army of smaller skeleton dragons similar to the story of sowing teeth of dragons into the ground to raise an army. He is also known as Tyr's Sword due to having Authority of Tyr, which allows him to temporarily resurrect his army of dragons to fight again.

Heretic Gods
Heretic Gods, or Rogue Gods, are gods that come to exist in real world, rather than staying as myths. A human who weakens and killed a Heretic God single-handedly will gain their abilities and become a Campione, while Campiones can also kill other Heretic Gods single-handedly to gain more abilities. Killing a Heretic God who is already weakened by someone else or cooperating with other people during the fight to kill them will not receive any ability. Note that even if killed, Heretic Gods will resurrect later as long as the myth is still known among humans.

Athena has a cold personality and seems willing to do anything to reclaim her lost powers. Her appearance is that of a young teenager with silver hair and black eyes similar to those of an owl. After using the Gorgoneion to transform herself into true her goddess, she was defeated by Godou Kusanagi and Erica Blandelli, returning to her youth form. She later returns to help Godou by offering information to defeat Perseus. In exchange for her assistance, Godou had to promise her that he would fulfill any one wish. It is stated that she lost her age and rank before becoming a Heretic God, so her young form appears to be a punishment of some kind. While she claims that she does not want anyone else to defeat Godou but her, she does seem to have taken an interest in Godou's growth and development. It is possible that, like Erica and the others, having watched and interacted with him she has started to develop feelings for him that she is not aware of or willing to admit to herself. This is shown when she sought his help after losing her memories. When she talked with Shizuka Kusanagi, it is hinted that her feelings towards Godou might be affectionate.

Verethragna is an ancient Persian warlord who likes to fight and will do anything to challenge a worthy opponent. He has defeated nine other warlords and inherited their abilities. He meets Godou in the form of the Youth, but he does not remember his name or that he is a god. After seeing that Godou possess the grimoire based on the Book of Prometheus, he flees. After recovering his divinity, he forgets that Godou has the grimoire. When Verethragna attacks in Sardinia, Godou uses the grimoire to steal Verethrana's incarnation of the Horse. After being defeated, his powers were usurped by Godou, who thereby became a Campione. Being joyful at finally being defeated, he blesses Godou before passing on, along with a stern command not to fall to anyone else before their rematch.

Perseus masquerades himself as a Greek hero, but he is actually the Persian god Mithra. He is known as the Legendary Dragon Killer, slaying any dragon he encounters but disregarding the consequences that come from killing the dragons. He possesses the Heroic Steel, being known in many myths worn to conquer dragons, which was use in rescuing and marrying any maiden in distress, allowing him to dominate and control any descendant of those goddesses and priestesses, as shown when he enthralled Liliana Kranjcar before Godou managed to break the spell since she loved him. Godou defeated him during the battle in a coliseum in front of an audience. Perseus was consumed by a shadowy figure, later recognized as Metis.

 Pandora, known to be the mother of all Campiones, appears twice in Godou's dreams when he is in the border between life and death after the Ram activated. She provides information, criticism, pep talks or even just small talk with any of the Campiones who either have just become a Campione, or died but have not yet revived through their Authorities. However, until the Campione reaches some level in an unknown aspect, most of the talk will be forgotten with only the subconscious remembering anything.

Secondary characters

She is a powerful witch whom Godou Kusanagi meets when returning a grimoire based on the Book of Prometheus in place of his grandfather, who had promised his departed wife to never meet with Lucrezia again. She attended college with and befriended Godou's grandfather, but she is able to retain the appearance of a young woman due to her high magic ability and talent. She has long, flaxen hair and voluptuous body and lives on the island of Sardinia. While living away from major cities she makes sure to have modern conveniences such as a refrigerator, air conditioning, and a computer with internet access. Lucretia is very knowledgeable about gods and magic, and also shares the same disposition with Erica Blandelli for always choosing the more interesting course of action and flirt with Godou. Deciding it would be more interesting, and keep Erica from blindly charging forth with it, Lucrezia returned the grimoire to Godou to help him deal make an alliance with a Heretic God named Melqart to defeat Verethragna to become a Campione.

Arianna is Erica's personal maid, chosen by her master due to her possessing interesting aspects. She has black hair and black eyes constantly wears a maid outfit, but she wears only a apron when wearing a swimsuit. Although smart, responsible and hardworking, she has a few flaws. She has extremely dangerous driving habits, her cooking is on a level to be found in any fancy restaurant, but any meals she cooks with a pot are considered awful. She has no martial or magic ability at all. While otherwise perfect, she will make a single unintentional major mistake every three days like clockwork.

Karen is Liliana's personal maid from North Macedonia, who notices Liliana's feeling toward Godou and often gives her advice as a push, as well as making fun of her master. She has short green hair and constantly wears a maid outfit unless meeting Erica in secret. She secretly sells copies of Liliana's romance novels. Karen is someone Erica feels is good to have a long term relationship with, as she considers selling privileged information on the Bronze Black Cross as too risky and thus is less likely to get caught from overextending herself. Although she appears to be a teenager, she has already learned and finished equivalency exams equal to that of a college degree. She is apprenticed to and learning how to be a witch from Liliana. She also occasionally takes bribes from Liliana's grandfather to get Liliana to dress and act more sexily and less strictly.

Shizuka is Godou's younger sister, who has short brown hair. She is a strong-willed girl who is suspicious about her brother's actions and fears that he has inherited their grandfather's lady-killer ways. Shizuka is aware of a multitude of girls, especially several of her friends, being fond of him but refuses to enlighten him about it. She worries that one day Godou will not only realize his extreme talent at attracting the love and affection of women, but will come to abuse it. Like Yuri Mariya, Shizuka often criticizes Godou, but it is a front for her concern for her brother. Since Godou's high school and her middle school are part of the same school complex, she is a member of the same tea ceremony club that Yuri belongs to. Shizuka is jealous of all the attention Godou receives from Erica.

Hikari is Yuri's younger sister, who is Hime-Miko at the apprentice level. She, like her sister, is stated to be a descendant of a Divine Ancestor, a former Mother Goddess defeated and cast down from her divinity. She used Yuri's cellphone to call Godou in order to get help from him to put off a young man who was relentlessly trying to recruit her to being the Hime-Miko of the temple under his guardianship. She revealed he was of a high ranking family so she could not simply tell him no, she needed the aide of someone whom even a member of one of the Four Families could not ignore or override. After a bit of talking, they are convinced to take a look and see what Hikari would be getting into, and go to visit the Monkey King that is sealed within the temple. Once there, meeting the Monkey King, they were attacked by the Campione Luo Hao, who wishes to fight and defeat the Monkey King, and forces Hikari to start unsealing the Monkey King using the sword Zanryuuto. After a short battle, Hikari, Yuri, and Godou escape into another part of the Netherworld and eventually return to the surface with the help of Godou's Wind Authority. Hikari has the rare power of Disaster Purification, which allows her to cancel and negate magical effects and powers. This ability will not work to the full extent on the Authorities of Campione or Heretic Gods, though it can diminish their power slightly. She has a huge crush on Godou as she stated that she will follow him like Erica and the others.

Media

Light novel
The first volume of Campione! was published on May 28, 2008. The series ended with the release of the 21st volume on November 22, 2017.

Manga
A manga adaptation illustrated by Jirō Sakamoto was serialized from the inaugural October 2011 issue of Shueisha's Super Dash & Go! to the magazine's final April 2013 issue, and was compiled into three volumes.

Anime
A 13-episode anime adaptation produced by Diomedéa and directed by Keizo Kusakawa aired in Japan on AT-X from July 6 to September 28, 2012 and has been licensed in North America by Sentai Filmworks. The anime adapts the first five volumes of the light novels, with the final episode being a self-contained story. The opening theme song is "BRAVE BLADE!" by Megu Sakuragawa and the closing theme song is "Raise" by Yui Ogura.

Episode list

References

External links
Official light novel website 
Official anime website 

2008 Japanese novels
2011 manga
2012 anime television series debuts
Anime and manga based on light novels
AT-X (TV network) original programming
Dash X Bunko
Diomedéa
Fantasy anime and manga
Harem anime and manga
Light novels
Sentai Filmworks
Shōnen manga
Shueisha books
Shueisha manga
Television shows based on light novels